Victor Kouassi (born Abidjan, 20 July 1971) is a former Ivorian rugby union player. He played as a fullback.

Kouassi played for Burotic Abidjan in Ivory Coast. He had four caps for Ivory Coast, from 1993 to 1995. He was called for the 1995 Rugby World Cup, playing all the three matches and scoring a conversion and two penalties, eight points in aggregate. He was the top scorer for Côte d'Ivoire in their first World Cup presence. He would not be called once more for his National Team.

References

External links
Victor Kouassi International Statistics

1971 births
Living people
Sportspeople from Abidjan
Ivorian rugby union players
Rugby union fullbacks